Seruwawila Mangala Raja Maha Vihara is an ancient Buddhist temple in Trincomalee district in Eastern Province, which is among the sixteen or seventeen holiest Buddhist shrines (Solosmasthana) in Sri Lanka.

It was built during the reign of King Kavan Tissa, Prince of Ruhuna, (2nd century BC) containing the Lalata Dathun Wahanse (sacred forehead bone) of Buddha. It can be reached by land and sea. The sea route begins at Trincomalee to Muttur on boat and another 16 km by roads and the land route is via Kantale, to Allai which is approximately 45 km through dense forest.

According to Richard Leslie Brohier, the Seruwila region was a vast swamp or villu where the flood waters of the Mahaweli Ganga collected. This villu was the home of large flocks of teals (seru) during migratory period. That perhaps was how the place came to be known as Seruwawila.

History and development
The area around Trincomalee was known as Nagadeepa in the past. This can be seen written in the maps of Taprobana as early as of Ptolemy (100CE) and until the time of 17th century CE. Nowadays, this region is not identified by Nagadeepa. It is believed that three viharas existed at this particular spot built during the periods of three former Buddhas named Kakusandha, Koṇāgamana and Kassapa with their relics enshrined. Gautama Buddha, who was the last Buddha in this eon, had personally visited this place and offered eight handfuls of 'sapu' flowers, then wished that the temple which constructing in future should be named as Mangala viharaya.

Later the Kingdom of Ruhuna was threatened by South Indian Chola and Pandya invaders during the reign of King Kavantissa (2nd century BC) then the king had to evolve a strategy to prevent the disaster.

According to the Vallipuram Gold Plate, King Vasabha (67 - 111 CE) appointed a minister named Isigiraye to this region.

Over the years, the stupa fell into decay under the pressure of the Tamil invasions from the north. But there are evidences in the literature that this area was under the purview of the Kandyan territory during the 17th century and the existence of this stupa. During the Western Colonial occupation, priority was given to fertile western part of the island then as a result the arid dry zone neglected and left into wilderness.

Present state of conservation

It was only in 1922 that the dagaba was re-discovered by Ven. Dambagasare Sumedhankara Thero and, assisted by the Archeological Department, he restored the stupa using remains of ancient structures around the stupa to conjecture the conservation work. The conservation was completed in 1931.

The stupa and its environs covering approximately 85 acres was declared as an Archaeological Reserve in 1962. After this the Department of Archaeology was carrying out conservation work by stages. In view of the importance of this sacred shrine and to attract more pilgrims to the area, the Department of Town and Country Planning drew up a plan for the development of a new town complete with pilgrim rests, market areas, etc. during the 1970s.

In June 2009, it was refurbished and ceremonially opened for the veneration of a large number of devotees at a cost of nearly Rs. 25 million by the National Physical Planning Department under the guidance of Urban Development and Sacred Area Development Minister Dinesh Gunawardane.

See also
 List of Archaeological Protected Monuments in Sri Lanka
 Ancient constructions of Sri Lanka
 Solosmasthana
 Dambagasare Sumedhankara Thero

Further reading
 Historic Seruwila: An unpublished M.A. dissertation by P.D. Ratnasiri submitted for the Post Graduate Examination in Archaeology of the University of Kelaniya. Submitted in May 2002.

References

External links
Official Website - Ministry of Culture and the Arts, Sri Lanka

Buddhist temples in Trincomalee District
Stupas in Sri Lanka
Archaeological protected monuments in Trincomalee District